eepee was a 1994 EP by Weeping Tile. It was the band's first recording.

Originally released independently, eepee was subsequently rereleased the following year after the band signed with Warner Music Canada.

Track listing
All songs written by Sarah Harmer, except "Don't Let it Bring You Down" by Neil Young. Some lyrics in "Westray" are patterned after Robert W. Service's poem "The Cremation of Sam McGee".

 "Anyone"  – 3:13
 "Basement Apt."  – 4:04
 "Dogs and Thunder"  – 5:09
 "Don't Let it Bring You Down"  – 3:51
 "The Room with the Sir John A. View"  – 5:04
 "Westray"  – 4:33
 "King Lion"  – 5:03

Credits
 Sarah Harmer – vocals, guitar
 Joe Chithalen – bass, viola, cello, backing vocals
 Gord Tough – guitar, backing vocals
 Chris Smirnios – drums
 Jason Euringer – bass, backing vocals
 Luther Wright – backing vocals
 Spencer Evans – piano
 James Chithalen – cello
 Grant Ethier – backing vocals

Weeping Tile (band) albums
1994 EPs